Old Royal Capital Cetinje (Montenegrin and Serbian: Prijestonica Cetinje / Пријестоница Цетиње) is one of the territorial subdivisions of Montenegro. It has the status of the Old Royal Capital, which is also translated in English as "Royal Town".

The seat of municipality is town of Cetinje. The municipality is located at the central and southwestern region of Montenegro.

Geography 

Cetinje is situated in the karst field (Cetinje field) of about 7 km2, with average height above sea level of 671m. Now, it is on the main road Podgorica-Cetinje-Budva, which makes it open to the inside of Montenegro and Montenegrin coast. Mount Lovćen rises from the borders of the Adriatic basin, closing the long and twisting bays of Bay of Kotor and making the hinterland to the coastal town of Kotor. The mountain has two imposing peaks, Štirovnik; 1,749 m (5,738 ft) and Jezerski vrh; 1,657 m (5,436 ft).

Municipal Parliament 
Skupština Prijestonice Cetinje is the Parliament of Old Royal Capital Cetinje. Local parliament is made up of 33 deputies, or odbornici (councillors) in Montenegrin. It is elected by universal ballot and is presided over by a speaker called the Predsjednik Skupštine (President of Parliament).

Demographics
According to the census of population, households and apartments in 2011, in the territory of The Old Royal Capital Cetinje live 16,757 inhabitants, or 2.7% of the population of Montenegro. In the town of Cetinje live 13.991 inhabitants. According to the number of inhabitants, Cetinje is one of the medium units of local government in Montenegro.

Gallery

References

Municipalities of Montenegro